Al Kavelin ( March 3, 1903- January 1982) was considered a highly influential bandleader of the 1930s. Noticeable achievements are including  Carmen Cavallaro in his band.

Al Kavelin was born in Minsk, Russian Empire and came to Denver, Colorado at the age of 7 with his family.  He was a graduate of the Royal Verdi Conservatory in Milan, Italy. During the 1930s at the urging of Eddie Duchin, Al Kavelin organized a similar orchestra to replace Duchin at the Central Park Casino, including Carmen Cavallero on the piano.  The orchestra played coast-to-coast over the years at such spots as the Waldorf-Astoria, the Essex House, and the Biltmore in New York, the Blackstone in Chicago, the Mark Hopkins in San Francisco.

1903 births
1982 deaths
20th-century American musicians
American bandleaders
American classical musicians
Emigrants from the Russian Empire to the United States